Gordon Joseph Brown (1904 – April 16, 1961) was an American politician in the state of Washington. He served in the Washington House of Representatives from 1951 to 1961 for District 6.

References

1904 births
1961 deaths
Democratic Party members of the Washington House of Representatives